Students of Scindia School are popularly known as Scindians, although the more correct term is ex-Scindians since within Scindia itself current pupils are known as Scindian, and alumni are referred to as ex-Scindia or, more simply, as Old Boys.

Although the total number of Scindians is relatively small (estimated at 9,000 since the school was founded in 1897), they include some of India's most prominent politicians, writers, government officials and business leaders:

Armed forces

Indian Air Force
Air Chief Marshal Pratap Chandra Lal
Chief of the Air staff Om Prakash Mehra
Air Marshal Dushyant Singh (AOC-in-C Eastern Air Command)

Indian Army
Lieutenant General Moti Dhar
Lieutenant General Samer Pal Singh Dhillon
Lieutenant General Ashok Handoo
Lieutenant General Sami Khan
Lieutenant General Vijay Kumar
Maj. General Jagdish Narain
Maj. General Surrinder Singh
Field Marshal K.M. Cariappa

Indian Navy
 Rear Admiral M Hasan Ali Khan
 Vice Admiral Sarwar Jahan Nizam

Politicians

Members of Parliament 
K. Natwar Singh, Indian National Congress From Rajasthan
Madhavrao Scindia, Bharatiya Janata Party From Madhya Pradesh
Pusapati Ashok Gajapati Raju, Union Minister for Civil Aviation, 2014 to 2018 From Andhra Pradesh
Jitendra Singh, Union Minister of State for PMO, 2014 to current From Jammu and Kashmir
Pavan Varma, Janata Dal (United)

Member of legislative assembly
Veer Vikram Singh, Bhartiya Janta Party From Uttar Pradesh for two consecutive terms

Governors

George Jivajirao Scindia, Governor of Gwalior State
Bharat Vir Wanchoo, Governor of Goa (From 2012)

Diplomats 

 Vikram Misri

Manufacturing

Kalyan Banerjee, Chairman United Phosphorus Ltd, President Rotary International

Writers

Anurag Mathur (Inscrutable American)
Sanjay Singh Yadav

Academics

Rajendra S. Pawar, Chairman of NIIT

Artists

Ananda Shankar, musician
Sanjay Singh Yadav, semi-finalist in UK Song Writing Contest 2013

Filmmakers and actors

Jalal Agha, actor
Sooraj R. Barjatya, director
Salman Khan, actor
Arbaaz Khan, actor
Anurag Kashyap, director
Nitin Mukesh, Singer
Meet Brothers, Musical Duo
Vikas Kalantri, actor
Ameen Sayani, broadcaster
Raj Zutshi, actor
Abhinav Kashyap, director
Anil Mehta, Cinematographer
Kushal Tandon, actor
Shadab Kamal, Actor
Sachin Krishn, Cinematographer

References

External links
 http://www.scindiaoldboys.com
 http://www.scindia.edu
 https://thecommonroom-scindia.com

Scindia School